Hednota is a genus of moths of the family Crambidae.

Species
 Hednota acontophora (Meyrick, 1882)
 Hednota ancylosticha Koch, 1966
 Hednota argyroeles (Meyrick, 1882)
 Hednota asterias Meyrick, 1887
 Hednota aurantiacus (Meyrick, 1879)
 Hednota bathrotricha (Lower, 1902)
 Hednota bifractellus (Walker, 1863)
 Hednota bivittella (Donovan, 1805)
 Hednota cotylophora (Turner, 1942)
 Hednota crypsichroa Lower, 1893
 Hednota cyclosema (Lower, 1896)
 Hednota demissalis (Walker, 1863)
 Hednota diacentra (Meyrick, 1897)
 Hednota diargyra (Turner, 1925)
 Hednota dichospila (Turner, 1937)
 Hednota empheres Koch, 1966
 Hednota enchias (Meyrick, 1897)
 Hednota eremenopa (Lower, 1903)
 Hednota grammellus (Zeller, 1863)
 Hednota hagnodes (Turner, 1942)
 Hednota haplotypa (Turner, 1904)
 Hednota hoplitellus (Meyrick, 1879)
 Hednota icelomorpha (Turner, 1906)
 Hednota impletellus (Walker, 1863)
 Hednota invalidellus (Meyrick, 1879)
 Hednota koojanensis Koch, 1966
 Hednota longipalpella (Meyrick, 1879)
 Hednota macroura (Lower, 1902)
 Hednota megalarcha (Meyrick, 1885)
 Hednota mesochra (Lower, 1896)
 Hednota ocypetes Meyrick, 1936
 Hednota odontoides Koch, 1966
 Hednota opulentellus (Zeller, 1863)
 Hednota orthotypa (Turner, 1904)
 Hednota panselenella (Meyrick, 1882)
 Hednota panteucha (Meyrick, 1885)
 Hednota pedionoma (Meyrick, 1885)
 Hednota peripeuces (Turner, 1942)
 Hednota perlatalis (Walker, 1863)
 Hednota pleniferellus (Walker, 1863)
 Hednota polyargyra (Turner, 1913)
 Hednota recurvellus (Walker, 1863)
 Hednota relatalis (Walker, 1863)
 Hednota stenipteralis (Lower, 1903)
 Hednota tenuilineata Koch, 1966
 Hednota thologramma Meyrick, 1936
 Hednota toxotis Meyrick, 1887
 Hednota trissomochla (Turner, 1911)
 Hednota urithrepta (Turner, 1925)
 Hednota vetustellus (Walker, 1863)
 Hednota xiphosema (Turner, 1904)
 Hednota xylophaea Meyrick, 1887

References

External links

Crambinae
Crambidae genera
Taxa named by Edward Meyrick